Ng Yong Woo Stanely (born 27 May 1992) is a Singaporean footballer who plays as a midfielder for Hougang United FC in the Sleague.

Club career

Geylang United

Ng began his professional football career with Geylang United FC in the Sleague in 2011.

Ng made his Sleague debut as the first prime league player in the year, he came on as a substitute against Young Lions. He appeared a couple of times in the Sleague.

Ng helped Geylang United prime league team to win the championship in his first season. Alongside the likes of Amy Recha, Wahyudi Wahid and Taufiq Ghani.

Courts Young Lions

In 2012, Ng signed for Courts Young Lions, however due to national service commitments Ng failed to make a single appearance throughout the 2012 season.

Ng returned to the Young Lions squad in only August 2013 season, made his debut against Hougang United and only making 5 appearances in the season.

In 2014, Ng stayed with the Courts Young Lions for his development of football, seems promising and exciting at the start of the season. Unfortunately, not the case for the remaining of the season as he found himself often on the bench. Also missing out a spot in the 2014 Asian Games in Incheon, South Korea.

Home United

In 2015, Ng signed for Home United FC, where he impressed and earned a regular starting spot and breaking his goal duck in April against Balestier Khalsa.
His impressive displays have not gone unnoticed as he was named as part of Singapore's squad for this home edition of the SEA Games. Scoring 4 goals and 5 assists in all competitions this season. Ng is quickly developing into one of the best wingers in the country. Quick on the ball and a good crosser.

Geylang International

Stanely resigned for the Eagles for the 2016 S.League season and scored on the opening day of the campaign, earning Geylang a share of the spoils in a 3-3 draw against title-favourites, Tampines Rovers.

Represented Geylang International alongside Amy Recha and Syazwan Buhari for Singapore Selection for this year's Sultan of Selangor's Cup 2016. Where Ng played an important role as he  scored a beautiful left-footed curler for the equaliser goal that cancelled out Gopinathan Ramachandra's goal. The Singapore Selection team went on to lift the Sultan of Selangor's Cup for the first time since 2011 by beating Selangor Selection 4-3 through a penalty shootout after the score was tied 1-1 at full-time.

Hougang United
Upon being released by Geylang International, Stanely signed for Hougang United for the 2018 S-League Season

International career

Youth

In 2008, the forward was part of the talented Class of '92 that became the first Singaporean youth team to qualify for a continental finals, when they made the AFC Under-16 Championship, scoring six goals in four games in the qualifiers.

While there was never any doubt over his talent, Ng's form dipped as his playing time with the Courts Young Lions was reduced during his National Service stint.

Senior
In 2014, the midfielder received his first call up to the senior team for friendlies against Hong Kong and Papua New Guinea but has yet to make a senior debut for the Lions.

In 2015, Ng was called up to the national team for the 2015 Southeast Asian Games in Singapore.

References

External links 
 

Singapore international footballers
1992 births
Living people
Singaporean footballers
Association football midfielders
Geylang International FC players
Singapore Premier League players
Young Lions FC players
Singaporean sportspeople of Chinese descent